Talbott is a surname. Notable people with the surname include:

People
Albert G. Talbott (1808–1887), American politician from Kentucky; U.S. representative 1855–59
Anna Talbott McPherson (fl. 20th century), American biographer
Carlos Talbott (born  1920), American Air Force officer; vice commander in chief of the Pacific Air Forces 1973–74
Frank Talbott (fl. 1907–1909), American Negro league baseball player
Gloria Talbott (1931–2000), American film and television actress
Harold E. Talbott (1888–1957), American businessman; Secretary of the Air Force 1953–55
Hudson Talbott (contemporary), American author and cartoonist
John Talbott (mayor) (contemporary), American politician from Washington State; mayor of Spokane 1998–2000
John R. Talbott, American finance expert, author, commentator, and political analyst
Joshua Frederick Cockey Talbott (1843–1918), American politician from Maryland; U.S. representative 1879–1918
Leander J. Talbott (1849–1924), American politician from Missouri; mayor of Kansas City 1884
Lee Talbott (1887–1954), American Olympic track and field athlete
Mark Talbott (contemporary), American professional squash player and coach
Michael Talbott (born  1955), American film and television actor
Nathan Talbott (born 1984), English professional football player
Strobe Talbott (born 1946), American journalist and diplomat
Thomas Talbott (contemporary), American professor of philosophy
John D. Talbott (born 1945), first Creative Director (1972-1982) of the Brookstone Company and writer and designer of its catalogs and retail advertising.

Fictional characters
Chase Talbott III, character from the comic strip Doonesbury

See also
 Talbot (surname)